Roger Ilegems (born 13 December 1962) is a retired track cyclist and road bicycle racer from Belgium, who was a professional rider from 1984 to 1991. He represented his native country at the 1984 Summer Olympics in Los Angeles, California, where he won the gold medal in the men's points race.

Teams
 1984: Tönissteiner-Lotto (Belgium, from 1 December 1984)
 1985: Lotto-Merckx (Belgium)
 1986: Lotto-Merckx (Belgium)
 1987: Sigma (Belgium)
 1988: Sigma (Belgium)
 1989: Histor-Sigma (Belgium)
 1991: Collstrop-Isoglass (Belgium)

References

External links
 Wielersite Profile

1962 births
Living people
Belgian male cyclists
Cyclists at the 1984 Summer Olympics
Olympic cyclists of Belgium
Olympic gold medalists for Belgium
Olympic medalists in cycling
Medalists at the 1984 Summer Olympics
Cyclists from Antwerp Province
People from Niel, Belgium
Belgian track cyclists